Jessica R. Suchy-Pilalis (born 1954) is an American specialist in the theory and practice of Byzantine chant,  Byzantine singer, composer, harpist,  and music educator.

Life and career

Jessica Suchy-Pilalis grew up in Milwaukee, Wisconsin, with her father (Raymond W. Suchy) a physicist and mother (Gregoria Karides Suchy) a composer, both professors at the University of Wisconsin-Milwaukee. She studied harp at the University of Wisconsin–Milwaukee with Jeanne Henderson, with Edward Druzinsky of the Chicago Symphony Orchestra, The Eastman School of Music with Eileen Malone and Indiana University with Susann McDonald, specializing in harp and music theory. She studied Byzantine music at Holy Cross Greek Orthodox Theological Seminary with Savas I. Savas and in Greece where she studied primarily with Dimitrios Sourlantzis and Eleftherios Georgiadis. She received diplomas with honors in Byzantine Music from two conservatories in Thessalonica, Greece, and is recognized/certified as an Hieropsalti (Chanter) by both the Greek Church and State.

In 1988, she received a fellowship from the Indiana Arts Commission and National Endowment for the Arts. In 1996 she took a teaching position with the Crane School of Music where she later became a department chair and received the rank of Professor. One of her specialty courses is Byzantium: Religion and the Arts in the Christian East. She also established a concert career, performing both in the US and abroad. She has toured in Greece as a solo harpist under the auspices of the U.S. Department of State, and performed at international music festivals and for Greek National Radio-Television. She was listed on the artist roster of Pennsylvania Performing Arts on Tour and is Principal Harp of the Orchestra of Northern New York.

Suchy-Pilalis is noted as a specialist in Byzantine music. In 1984, she became what is thought to be the first officially titled and salaried female Psalti of the Greek Orthodox Church of North and South America, serving as Protopsalti at Holy Trinity Greek Orthodox Church in Indianapolis. She holds certifications from both the State and Church of Greece. Bishop Timotheos of Detroit gave her the lesser ordination of Rasophoros (honorific for wearer of an ecclesiastical garment) and Metropolitan Maximos of Detroit tonsured her as an Anagnostis (Reader)/Psalti. Suchy-Pilalis also conducted a year of research on Byzantine music in Greece through a grant from the Taylor Foundation. Her research involves modal analysis of Byzantine chant and, using the results of the analyses, she sets English translations of hymns as a Byzantine Melodist. In 2006, she was awarded   the  Medallion  of  St.  Romanos the  Melodist by the National Federation of Greek Orthodox Church Musicians. Selected hymns have been recorded by Archangel Voices (Vladimir Morosan, Director) and the Boston Byzantine Choir (Charles Marge, Director). Presently, she chants at St. Olympia Orthodox Church, Potsdam, NY, and Holy Trinity Greek Orthodox Cathedral, Camp Hill, PA.

Suchy-Pilalis' research in harp includes historical harps. She is a specialist on the life and compositions of Madame Delaval and has restored a single-action Erard harp specifically for performances of Madame Delaval's compositions.  She has served as Vice-President of the Historical Harp Society and as a member of the board, and has been a member of the editorial board of the American Harp Journal.

Works
Selected works include:
Kanon of St. Kosmas for the Nativity of Christ (Orthodox Music Press, 2011)
Hymns for Pascha
Divine Liturgy in the Varys Mode in Greek and English
Guide to the Byzantine Modes: The Mnemonic Verses (two versions)
Troparion of the Forefeast of the Cross and numerous other troparia for feasts and saints
The Order of Service for the Lesser Sanctification of Water
Prayer of Thanksgiving (paraliturgical)

Suchy-Pilalis appears on a number of recordings as a harpist. She has also written articles including "The Mysterious Madame Delaval (Part I)", published in the American Harp Journal.

References

1955 births
American classical harpists
American women classical composers
American classical composers
American music educators
American women music educators
Eastman School of Music alumni
Indiana University alumni
Living people
University of Wisconsin–Milwaukee alumni
21st-century American women